Michael Coad is a former professional Australian rules footballer who played with Australian Football League (AFL) club Gold Coast.

Originally from South Australian National Football League (SANFL) club Sturt, Coad was drafted by Gold Coast as a mature age rookie with pick number two of the 2010 AFL Rookie draft and was elevated to Gold Coast's senior list for their first season.  He made his senior AFL debut against Western Bulldogs in round 3 of the 2011 AFL season.

Coad suffered a serious hamstring injury in his 2nd game for the Gold Coast, ruling him out for the remainder of the 2011 season. Coad was delisted by Gold Coast on 3 September 2011 but redrafted by them in the 2012 Rookie draft. Coad has since played one further AFL match for Gold Coast. Coad then moved back to Sturt of the South Australian Football League in 2013, soon being selected as Captain for the Sturt Football Club. In 2015 Coad called quits on his senior football career.

References

External links

1983 births
Living people
Gold Coast Football Club players
Australian rules footballers from South Australia
Sturt Football Club players